Batman: The Cult is a four-issue comic book miniseries. It was published by DC Comics in their Prestige Format and released in 1988. It was written by Jim Starlin, illustrated by Bernie Wrightson, colored by Bill Wray and edited by Denny O'Neil.

Plot 
The story follows the machinations of Deacon Blackfire and his band of homeless followers, who have kidnapped Batman before the events of this story. Following a lengthy period of captivity, Batman slowly succumbs to brainwashing. Batman is eventually freed from the cult, but takes a long time to recover from his treatment at their hands.  
The story also delves into other territory. Gotham City politicians are assassinated by Blackfire's party of followers. An attempt on Commissioner Gordon's life is made by Blackfire's group, leaving him in a hospital. Beyond Gotham, the authorities try to protect the city, then the National Guard is called in, then the military, and finally martial law is declared on Gotham.   
The miniseries also features the second Robin, Jason Todd.

Collected editions
The miniseries was later collected in 1991 as a trade paperback graphic novel. This collected volume went to four printings. A new edition (the fifth printing) was released in November 2009.

In other media
 Along with The Dark Knight Returns, "Batman: Knightfall", and "Batman: No Man's Land", Batman: The Cult miniseries served as an influence for Christopher Nolan's 2012 film The Dark Knight Rises. Instead of Deacon Blackfire, Bane and the League of Shadows come to Gotham and use the sewers as a hideout, with the same agenda of destroying the city for its corruption. They begin by hiring homeless people to do various work in furnishing a section of the sewer and Batman's experiences in "the pit" is similar to what he experiences in Blackfire's lair in the sewer. After being captured by Bane's men, Bruce spends the next few months inside the underground prison and begins hearing legends of Bane's early life from other inmates, and the scene where Bruce hallucinates Ra's al Ghul's return is similar to Blackfire's confrontation with Batman during his imprisonment. In both scenes, Ra's al Ghul and Blackfire express their disappointments in Bruce/Batman for failing to save Gotham. Due to Batman's absence, Bane takes control of Gotham by destroying the bridges and using debris to barricade the tunnels to trap the citizens inside and, similar to Blackfire's actions, Bane encourages the citizens to overthrow the wealthy, leading to violence in the streets.
 Deacon Blackfire and his cult make their debut in adapted media in Batman: Arkham Knight, voiced by Marc Worden. Deacon Blackfire is the villain behind the "Lamb to the Slaughter" side quest. He tries to sacrifice Jack Ryder for investigating Deacon Blackfire's cult. Batman fights the cultists to get to Jack Ryder. After the cultists are defeated, Batman disables the electrical generators powering the sacrificial cage, defeats Deacon Blackfire, and frees Jack Ryder.

Notes

References

1988 comics debuts
Batman titles
Comics by Jim Starlin
Batman storylines